is the first full album by the Japanese artist Kotoko. It was released on April 21, 2004. Later on June 20, 2006, she released an English version of this album with the same title Hane but without its kanji.

Original track listing
 Introduction - 0:58
Composition: Maiko Iuchi
Arrangement: Kazuya Takase, Tomoyuki Nakazawa
 Asura - 5:23
Composition/Arrangement: Kazuya Takase
Lyrics: Kotoko
  - 7:07
Composition/Lyrics: Kotoko
Arrangement: Kazuya Takase
  - 7:06
Composition/Lyrics: Kotoko
Arrangement: Kazuya Takase, Tomoyuki Nakazawa
  - 4:36
Composition/Arrangement: Tomoyuki Nakazawa
Lyrics: Kotoko
  - 4:26
Composition/Lyrics: Kotoko
Arrangement: Sorma No.3
  - 4:48
Composition/Lyrics: Kotoko
Arrangement: Fish Tone
  - 6:47
Composition/Lyrics: Kotoko
Arrangement: Kazuya Takase
  - 7:20
Composition/Lyrics: Kotoko
Arrangement: C.G mix
 Lament - 5:47
Composition/Arrangement: Kazuya Takase
Lyrics: Kotoko
  - 5:25
Composition/Lyrics: Kotoko
Arrangement: Tomoyuki Nakazawa
  - 7:39
Composition/Lyrics: Kotoko
Arrangement: Kazuya Takase
  - 5:13
Composition/Lyrics: Kotoko
Arrangement: Sorma No.3

English track listing
 Introduction
Composition: Maiko Iuchi
Arrangement: Kazuya Takase, Tomoyuki Nakazawa
 Asura
Composition/Arrangement: Kazuya Takase
Lyrics: Kotoko
 Droplets of Winter
Composition/Lyrics: Kotoko
Arrangement: Kazuya Takase
 Whirlwind Clouds
Composition/Lyrics: Kotoko
Arrangement: Kazuya Takase, Tomoyuki Nakazawa
 Gratitude: Under a Large Chestnut Tree
Composition/Arrangement: Tomoyuki Nakazawa
Lyrics: Kotoko
 Illusion
Composition/Lyrics: Kotoko
Arrangement: Sorma No.3
 It Hurts
Composition/Lyrics: Kotoko
Arrangement: Fish Tone
 Soliloquy
Composition/Lyrics: Kotoko
Arrangement: Kazuya Takase
 If My Voice Is to Be Heard
Composition/Lyrics: Kotoko
Arrangement: C.G mix
 Lament
Composition/Arrangement: Kazuya Takase
Lyrics: Kotoko
 Footprint
Composition/Lyrics: Kotoko
Arrangement: Tomoyuki Nakazawa
 Wings
Composition/Lyrics: Kotoko
Arrangement: Kazuya Takase
 Canary
Composition/Lyrics: Kotoko
Arrangement: Sorma No.3

2004 albums
Kotoko (singer) albums